Pattathu Yaanai is a 2013 Indian Tamil-language action comedy film written and directed by Boopathy Pandian and produced by Michael Rayappan.

The film stars Vishal and Aishwarya Arjun with Santhanam playing a supporting role. Music was composed by S. Thaman, and the film released on 26 July 2013. The film opened to average reviews.

Plot
The story opens in Karaikudi, where Gouravam (Santhanam) is a well-known traditional cook making a living undertaking orders for marriage functions. He is forced into taking an order for a local goon's wedding and is not happy about it.  Saravanan (Vishal) and his four friends, who come to work for him as junior cooks, offer to help him but land him in even greater trouble and they are forced to flee from Karaikudi.

The story shifts to Trichy, where Saravanan and his friends have grand plans of opening a restaurant with the help of Gouravam and his money.  Here, just like in Malaikottai, it is love at first sight for Saravanan when he sees Aishwarya (Aishwarya Arjun). Things go wrong and as their love deepens we are introduced to two rival gangs, Kasi and Manaa along with a ‘Madurai Anachi’ who are constantly at each other's throat.

In a conflict Manaa forces Aishwarya to marry him and in the process of saving his love Saravanan reveals his past. Saravanan is a jail returnee who had killed three people in Madurai including Anachi's only son, to avenge the murder of an orphan kid whom Saravanan considered his little sister. The rest of the story is how Saravanan protects his love and defeat his foes.

Cast

 Vishal as Karaikudi Saravana
 Aishwarya Arjun as Aishwarya
 Santhanam as  Gouravam (Son) / Poongavanam (Father)
 Chitra Lakshmanan as Inspector
 Mayilsamy as Jackpot
 Jagan as Ada Murugesan
 Karthik Sabesh as Pongal Kumar
 Vada Poche Sarithiran as Vada Ganesan
 Murali Sharma as Marudhamuthu
 John Vijay as Daya
 Pattimandram Raja as Rajaram
Trichy Shankar
Ajay Sena
Saba Boopathy
 Besant Ravi as Kada Murugan
Maha Gandhi
Raneesh
 Seetha
Karthik
Baby Jeyashree
 Mouli
 Subbu Panchu as Collector
 Rajendran as Hotel Owner
 Bava Lakshmanan as Andaa
 Badava Gopi as Teacher
 Nellai Siva as Constable
 Ambani Shankar as Hotel Servant Boy
 Swaminathan as Doctor
 Muthukaalai
 Manobala
 Yogi Babu as Henchman
 Singamuthu
 Crane Manohar
 Cool Suresh
 Rangammal K. R. as Gouvram's servant

Production
Following a successful collaboration with the 2007 film Malaikottai, Vishal and Boopathy Pandian signed terms to make another film together in 2010. Boopathy Pandian subsequently moved on to make a film titled Vedi with Vikram in the lead role, but the film was cancelled after an initial schedule. In November 2010, it was reported that Pandian and Vishal would make another film under the Vishal's home banner, GK Films Corporation, in a venture titled Pattathu Yaanai and that it would feature the story that Pandian had planned for Vikram in his project Vedi. In a turn of events, the director decided to opt out of the project and do the film instead with Arya and his banner, Show People. The deal took place without the knowledge of GK Corporation who had paid him and advance, with the production house's director Shriya Reddy criticizing the director. But Arya opted out of the project. Boopathy Pandian after opting out of Telugu film Jagan Mohan IPS subsequently agreed again to make the film with Vishal and Michael Rayappan agreed to produce the film under Global Infotainment Ltd.

Reports suggested that Amala Paul was set to be signed on to play the lead female role in the film, but this proved to be untrue. Subsequently, Aishwarya Arjun, daughter of actor Arjun, was signed on to make her debut with the film. She would be portraying a Plus 2 student in the film, and was signed after being recommended by director Sundar C. Vadivelu was initially announced to be making a comeback with the film but was later replaced by Santhanam who would be seen in three roles, that of a grandfather, father and son. The film began filming in December 2012 with a lunch event at the AVM studios, with a scene shot of Vishal praying at the Muthukumaraswamy temple in the studio premises. The team shot in locations across Karaikudi, Madurai and Trichy as a part of the initial schedule with Seetha, Jagan and Manobala added to the cast. A first look poster was released on 14 April 2013 depicting Vishal and Santhanam in their respective roles.

Soundtrack

Music is composed by S. Thaman collaborating with Bhoopathy Pandian and Vishal for first time. Lyrics were written by Na. Muthukumar, Annamalai and Sarathy. The audio released on 23 June 2013 Milliblog called it "tired and sedate", India glitz wrote:" Album made with Commercial aspects in mind" while Behindwoods claimed that it "lacks freshness and fun".

Release
The satellite rights of the film were sold to Zee Thamizh. The film released on 26 July 2013 in 850 screens.

Critical reception
Pattathu Yaanai opened to mixed reviews from critics. S Saraswathi of Rediff said, "Pattathu Yaanai is a good and half-hearted effort by both Pandian and Krishna. The film has a purely written script and has either the music or the performances to carry it through. Only the comic elements in the film and Santhanam make it most watchable."

in.com said, "Pattathu Yaanai is not boring! Boopathy Pandian has come up with decade old story again and has stick with the formula of songs, action, sentiment and comedy. The problem is the strong script and greater strength to integrate all these commercial elements in screenplay properly. He is good at mixing humour at most expected circumstances and that’s the only thing that worked to some extent in this film with the help of Santhanam.".

Prashanth Reddy of Desimartini.com said, "Pattathu Yaanai is an action-comedy at heart where momentary spurts of action are just a relief from what would have otherwise been a full-fledged comedy. The film makes more sense when you look at it as a comedy about the exploits of a bunch of wedding caterers who run from trouble and arrive in Tiruchy- only to find more trouble." and added "But because of the film's "mass entertainer" aspirations, it brings in utterly necessary characters, like the heroine, who adds greater value to the story, besides being heavily sentimental. In spite of it, the film still manages to entertain and how- thanks to the one man who has been consistently delivering time and again: Santhanam,".

Behindwoods said, "Vishal has sincerely delivered what is expected from him. If you were to expect Vishal to showcase his six pack abs, you would not be disappointed but the twist in the tale comes from the villain who removes his shirt to flaunt his chiseled torso. Action scenes though well choreographed, offers nothing new." and added "Aishwarya Arjun looks emaciated but fits into her docile role. Pattathu Yaanai is an apt vehicle for the debutante and there is not much for her to demonstrate in the department of histrionics."

Indiaglitz.com said, "Pattathu Yaanai' is the same new wine. If you have to consider the exclusion of Chennai city in the story, casting the heroine as a high school girl, instead of a college student and villain gang with a light sense of humour, then it is old wine in new bottle."

References

External links
 

2013 films
2013 action comedy films
Films shot in Madurai
Films shot in Tiruchirappalli
2010s Tamil-language films
Films set in Tiruchirappalli
Films scored by Thaman S
Films shot in Karaikudi
2013 masala films
Indian action comedy films
Films directed by Boopathy Pandian
2013 comedy films